Bo Diddley Is a Gunslinger is the fifth studio album by American rock and roll pioneer Bo Diddley released in December 1960 by Checker Records. The album title comes from the album's first track called "Gunslinger" and the cover art has Bo Diddley dressed in Western-style clothing. The songs for Bo Diddley is a Gunslinger were recorded from October 1959 to February 1960. Several tracks of interest  are "Sixteen Tons" which Bo was supposed to perform on The Ed Sullivan Show,  the title track, and "Diddling" (an instrumental between guitar and saxophone).

Songs

"Gunslinger"
This song was originally released as the a-side of Checker single 965 in November 1960. The singles B-side "Signifying Blues" was never released on the album. The song features a Bo Diddley beat. Warren Zevon performed the song as "Bo Diddley's a Gunslinger" on his 1981 live album Stand in the Fire.

"Ride on Josephine"
"Ride on Josephine" was a rock and roll song with backing vocals and piano work by either Otis Spann, Lafayette Leake, or Billy Stewart. The song has been covered by George Thorogood & The Destroyers, Sleepy LaBeef, Eric Sardinas, and Van Morrison.

"Sixteen Tons"
Bo Diddley was asked to perform "Sixteen Tons" on The Ed Sullivan Show but performed "Bo Diddley" instead .

"Cadillac"
The song "Cadillac" features Gene Barge on tenor saxophone, and has been covered by The Kinks, The Downliners Sect, New Colony Six, and sung as a duet by Van Morrison and Linda Gail Lewis. Cadillac was also the name of the guitar that is featured on the album's front cover.

Other songs/styles
The song "Googlia Moo", as well as "No More Lovin'" and others, gives the album a doo-wop feel.<ref name="AM">{{cite web |first=Bruce|last=Eder |title=Bo Diddley Is a Gunslinger [Bonus Tracks] > Review |url= |publisher=Allmusic |access-date=August 23, 2010}}</ref>

Track listing

PersonnelPer allmusic''
Bo Diddley – lead vocals, lead guitar
Jerome Green – maracas, backing vocals
Willie Dixon – bass
Bobby Baskerville – bass
Jesse James Johnson – electric bass
Billy Downing – drums
Clifton James – drums
Lafayette Leake – piano
Otis Spann – piano
Billy Stewart – piano
Peggy Jones – rhythm guitar, backing vocals
Gene Barge – tenor saxophone
Johnny Carter – backing vocals
Harvey Fuqua – backing vocals
Lily "Bee Bee" Jamieson – backing vocals
Gloria Morgan – backing vocals
Nate Nelson – backing vocals
Leonard Chess – producer
Andy McKaie – Reissue producer
Vartan – Art direction

Charts
The album spent one week on the UK Album Charts on November 9, 1963 at No. 20.

Release history

References

Bo Diddley albums
1962 albums
Checker Records albums
Albums produced by Leonard Chess
Albums produced by Phil Chess
Albums produced by Bo Diddley